The fifth cabinet of Milo Đukanović was the cabinet of Montenegro from 29 February 2008 to 29 December 2010. It was a coalition government composed of Coalition for a European Montenegro and Democratic Union of Albanians.

History

Šturanović resignation
Prime Minister Željko Šturanović resigned from the office on 31 January 2008 for health reasons, saying that the therapy he was prescribed required him to work much less than would be possible while serving as Prime Minister.
 He remained in office until Đukanović was approved by Parliament and sworn in at the end of February.

Đukanović return to the office
On 20 February 2008, President Filip Vujanović nominated former long-lerm PM Milo Đukanović as new prime minister after Šturanović resigned. He was accordingly elected as prime minister on 29 February 2008 by a majority vote in the Parliament of Montenegro, which marks his return to the office after retiring in 2006.

2009 parliamentary election
Elections for the composition of new parliament of Montenegro were held on 29 March, 2009 and resulted in a new absolute majority won for the ruling Coalition for a European Montenegro (DPS, SDP and BS) led by PM Milo Đukanović (The result translates to 47 out of the 81 seats in the Parliament). Milo Đukanović secured the continuation of his term as Prime Minister, with mostly of the same ministers in government.

Đukanović resignation
After giving indications he would step down once the European Union granted official candidate status to Montenegro's membership application, which it did on 17 December 2010, Đukanović resigned as prime minister on 21 December 2010. His party's leadership proposed Deputy Prime Minister and Finance Minister Igor Lukšić to lead the new government. Lukšić was confirmed as the new prime minister by the Parliament of Montenegro on 29 December 2010.

Cabinet composition

See also
Milo Đukanović
Government of Montenegro

References

Government of Montenegro
Cabinets established in 2008
2008 establishments in Montenegro